The St Philip's Hospital was a medical facility at Sheffield Street in London.

History
The hospital was established in a former workhouse infirmary building as a hospital specialising in the treatment of women suffering from venereal disease in 1920. It became the Sheffield Street Hospital in 1930 and joined the National Health Service in 1948. After venereal disease became less prevalent, the hospital joined the Institute of Urology (formed by St Peter's Hospital and St Paul's Hospital) in 1952. The hospitals became known as "the three Ps." After all urology services were transferred to the Middlesex Hospital, the institute closed in 1992. The hospital was subsequently demolished and the site is now occupied by the Saw Swee Hock Student Centre.

References

Hospitals established in 1920
Hospitals disestablished in 1992
1920 establishments in England
Defunct hospitals in London